Eucosma monitorana, the red pinecone borer moth, is a species of moth of the family Tortricidae. It is found in North America, including Pennsylvania, Ontario, Wisconsin and Maryland.

The wingspan is about 17 mm.

The larvae feed on Pinus species, including Pinus resinosa. They feed on the cones of their host plant. Pupation takes place in the soil.

Gallery

References

Moths described in 1920
Eucosmini